Robin Hanley (5 January 1968 – 12 September 1996) was an English first class cricketer. He was born on 5 January 1968 in Tonbridge, Kent and died on 12 September 1996 at the age of 28. He played five first class and three List A limited overs games for Sussex as a right-handed batsman, over three seasons from 1990 to 1992.

References

Sussex cricketers
People from Tonbridge
1996 deaths
1968 births
Cricketers from Kent